Metriochroa is a genus of moths in the family Gracillariidae.

Species
Metriochroa alboannulata Bai, 2016
Metriochroa argyrocelis Vári, 1961
Metriochroa carissae Vári, 1963
Metriochroa celidota Bradley, 1965
Metriochroa fraxinella Kumata, 1998
Metriochroa inferior (Silvestri, 1914)
Metriochroa latifoliella (Millière, 1886)
Metriochroa pergulariae Vári, 1961
Metriochroa psychotriella Busck, 1900
Metriochroa scotinopa Vári, 1963
Metriochroa symplocosella Kobayashi, Huang & Hirowatari, 2013
Metriochroa syringae Kumata, 1998
Metriochroa tylophorae Vári, 1961

External links
Global Taxonomic Database of Gracillariidae (Lepidoptera)

Phyllocnistinae
Gracillarioidea genera